Viševica is a mountain in Gorski Kotar, Croatia. Its highest peak is the eponymous Viševica at 1,428 m.a.s.l.

References

Mountains of Croatia
Landforms of Primorje-Gorski Kotar County